Caroline Stuart, Countess of Seafield (30 June 1830 – 6 October 1911), styled The Countess Dowager from 1884 to 1911, was a member of the Scottish aristocracy. She was proprietor of the Seafield Estates following the death of her son in 1884 and has been described as 'The last of the great feudal chiefs'.

Genealogy

The Honourable Caroline Henrietta Stuart was the youngest child of Robert Walter, 11th Lord Blantyre, of the family of the Stuarts of Minto. Aged 20, on 12 August 1850 she married John Charles Ogilvy-Grant who, then styled Lord Reidhaven and Master of Grant, was heir to the Seafield and Findlater estates. Their only child, Ian Charles was born 7 October 1851. On 30 July 1853 John Charles succeeded his father as Earl of Seafield and Chief of the Clan Grant. Her husband and son were to die within a few years of each other: Lord Seafield on 18 February 1881 and Ian Charles on 31 March 1884.
 
As he was unmarried and had no children, by a will made c.1882 Ian Charles left his mother as the heir to his estates. Taking the style of The Countess Dowager, Lady Seafield was proprietor of the Seafield and Grant Estates until her death.  Meanwhile the 8th Earl's titles of honour were inherited by his uncle, James Ogilvy-Grant, 9th Earl of Seafield who was otherwise the nearest male heir. The Seafield title was thus for some generations separated from the lands and properties that had maintained it. This situation had been made possible because the 7th Earl, John Charles, had completed the legal procedure of disentailing the estate. Lady Seafield died on 6 October 1911. Her funeral was held on 12 October. Her coffin rests, with those of her husband and son, in the Seafield Mausoleum in the Duthil Old Parish Church and Churchyard.

As Countess of Seafield
In the section 'Public and Social Work' in the tribute volume published after her death, the editors highlighted Lady Seafield's support for her husband's direction of his estates. Mention was made of her interest in his patronage of individuals via appointments in the established church and through educational bursaries, for his programme of afforestation and: 'in general improvements effected throughout the estate, his lordship had always the affectionate advice and warm interest of the Countess'. She was, though, primarily a social hostess:The Earl and Countess spent usually a portion of every spring in London, but the rest of the year was passed between Cullen House, Castle Grant, and Balmacaan (in Glen Urquhart). For Balmacaan they had an especial affection It was the place where they had spent the early years of their married life and every time they returned to it with renewed pleasure. At each of their residences they entertained select parties of guests, and in no sphere did the Countess of Seafield more winningly display her gracious gifts of manner than as the bright, polished and vivacious hostess of guests who were under the roof-tree of the Chieftain of the Clan Grant.

As Countess Dowager of Seafield
After the deaths of John Charles and Ian Charles, Lady Seafield's priorities as Countess Dowager, besides overseeing the management of her estates, were to 'take steps for the perpetuation of (her son's) memory and that of her husband in schemes of enduring utility'. The first of these was a public hospital for Strathspey, named the Ian Charles Hospital in his memory: Thus, fifteen months after his death, in May 1885 there was opened at Grantown-on-Spey the Ian Charles Hospital. The erection and endowment of such a hospital had been arranged by the Countess Dowager and her son. It had been little more than founded when the Earl died, and his sorrowing mother brought the undertaking to a completion. All who know the capital of Strathspey know the place well.... The hospital was and is fitted with all necessary conveniences and comforts for the treatment and care of the sick, and has been of untold benefit to the Speyside district of the Seafield estates.  In addition the Dowager Countess had the Church of Scotland parish church of Inverallan, located in Grantown-on-Spey, rebuilt by her architect: she laid the memorial stone on 1 May 1886 on the occasion of the dedication of the building for worship. Memorial tablets to her husband and son were presented to this and all the other parishes churches within the estate. 

Other biographical headings from the memorial Tribute are:
 Head of a Great Estate
 Lady Seafield and Fishing Interests
 Religious and Philanthropic Work
 A Gracious Hostess
 Lady Seafield and the (Armed) Services
 Chieftainess of Clan Grant
 Some Public Activities

Assessments
 James Cameron, the Duthil author, writing in 1899:Lady Seafield has the credit of being one of the most exemplary, the most liberal, the most charitable and generous, both as an individual and as a proprietrix north side of the Grampians, if not in a wider circle. In this respect she stands in the first rank of women.
 Sir Robert Bruce Lockhart, remembering his childhood holidays in Strathspey in My Scottish Youth: She settled down at Castle Grant and Cullen to devote the rest of her life to good works. She carried out her duties as a great landowner and as chieftain of Clan Grant with scrupulous attention to detail. She visited all her tenants regularly, and, by patting their children on the head and listening to their troubles, identified herself with their lives. ... Undoubtedly she was imperious, regarding her wishes as law throughout her domains. (And yet) By the vast majority of tenants she was loved with much the same veneration and pride that the British public lavished on Queen Victoria. She was the last of the great feudal chiefs.
 Lord Strathspey, in his A History of Clan Grant (1983) wrote that, while 'She had enormous power in her lifetime', by the time she died 'very few of the inhabitants actually knew her at all, since she did not go round much.' He did give credit, however, to her management of the estates: 'During her life she kept the estates intact and tried to pay off the debt, which, in fact, she nearly succeeding in doing - an achievement much to her credit.'  Lord Strathspey was particularly critical of the Countess Dowager's policy of keeping at a long distance those who inherited her son's titles of honour: James Ogilvy-Grant, 9th Earl of Seafield, Francis William Ogilvy-Grant, 10th Earl of Seafield and James Ogilvy-Grant, 11th Earl of Seafield. 'All family contacts with her ... were through her law agent. Through him she sent various members of the family periodic small remittances ... and they were, it would thus appear, paid to keep away.'

Lady Seafield and the Seafield Mausoleum, Duthil
After Duthil Parish Church was reconstructed in the 1830s, and a former family vaunt was closed, Francis William Ogilvy-Grant, 6th Earl of Seafield had a new self-standing Mausoleum built 1837-39 immediately beside the church in the churchyard. The coffins of both John Charles and Ian Charles were interred here and the Countess Dowager then had a second, twin, Mausoleum built, located just outside the existing churchyard. Here James Ogilvy-Grant, 9th Earl of Seafield was interred in 1888.

The Rev. James Bain, minister of the Church of Scotland parish of Duthil 1877-1911 sought to prevent the building of the second Mausoleum, claiming the first was insanitary as the coffins it held were stored above ground, unburied. After considerable controversy, his claims were shown to be wholly unfounded. His pamphlet, 'The Seafield Mausoleums and Duthil Churchyard case. A specimen of how officials tamper with the law in Scotland when they want to serve the great. Correspondence between J. Bain, Henry D. Littlejohn and Sir William Harcourt,' (Elgin, 1885) contained his objections.

The funeral of the Rt. Hon. Caroline, Countess Dowager of Seafield was held on 12 October 1911. This was the last use of the original Seafield Mausoleum. Having earlier had the second Mausoleum built, by her will Lady Seafield closed the first.  A plaque bolted across its door reads: "In terms of the Testamentary Writings of Caroline Stuart, Countess Dowager of Seafield, this Mausoleum has been closed and is not to be used for further interments. February 1913." The Tribute volume of 1911  contained an account of proceedings at the Mausoleum at the end of her funeral.:The procession moved slowly into the churchyard, and when the dirge of the pipes had died away, there was heard the voice of the noble clergyman reciting the solemn committal service - “I am the Resurrection and the Life.” The pallbearers followed the coffin into the darkened interior, from which the voice of the officiating clergyman came to the throng outside. When the obsequies were over, once more there was heard over the calm and peaceful scene the tender, expressive music of the Highlanders. The piper of The Mackintosh of Mackintosh, Mr Duncan Macdonald, at the bidding of his chief, played as few could so well that fine setting - “The Lament for the Only Son”. It came as the climax and the end to a series of ceremonies that will have an abiding place in the memory of all who witnessed them. There are two mausoleums in the churchyard which have been the burying place of the family. In the one that was opened on Thursday was placed the body of the seventh Earl of Seafield, husband of the Countess, who died in 1881. Here also were brought the remains of their only son, Ian Charles, who died in 1884. The last vacant niche will be filled by the coffin of the late Countess. In the mausoleum on Thursday the coffins of husband and son were to be seen, lying side by side. That of the Countess, now rejoining in the silence of the tomb those whose early deaths threw a shadow over the greater portion of her life, was placed temporarily at right angles to the others. The latter were still covered with wreaths, the Countess, up to a comparatively recent date, having regularly visited the mausoleum. The three coffins will now be placed together in a common recess, and the mausoleum will then be permanently closed. After the chief mourners had left the mausoleum, after the office for the death had been fully recited, when all had been done for the honoured dead that devoted mourners could do, an opportunity was given to the company of filing past the coffin and of seeing where three members of the great family are sleeping their last long sleep.

References

External links
Clan Grant: http://www.clangrant.org

Seafield Estate: http://www.seafield-estate.co.uk

Carrbridge:
www.scotlandsplaces.gov.uk – Duthil, Old Parish Church and Churchyard
 Canmore – Duthil, Old Parish Church and Churchyard
 Carrbridge History: Old Parish Church - Duthil

See also

1830 births
1911 deaths
Carrbridge
Scottish countesses
Daughters of barons
20th-century Scottish people
20th-century Scottish women
19th-century Scottish people
19th-century Scottish women